The Lana Sisters were a British vocal group formed by Iris Long in 1958, along with Lynne Abrams. They put an advert in The Stage for a third member and got a reply from Mary O'Brien, who would go on to solo success a few years later as Dusty Springfield. After Iris left the Lana Sisters, she formed the Chantelles with two friends.

They were managed by Evelyn Taylor, as they toured around England. They appeared on the BBC's Drumbeat with Adam Faith and John Barry, and later took part in a Christmas special "Tommy Steele’s Spectacular" with the song "Seven Little Girls Sitting in the Backseat".

They appeared twice at the Royal Albert Hall and toured with Cliff Richard, Adam Faith, and Morecambe & Wise. Their cover of the Marv Johnson song "You Got What It Takes" became a Top 10 hit in Ireland in 1960.

When Dusty Springfield left the Lana Sisters she joined her brother Tom Springfield and another friend (Tim Feild) to make The Springfields. She went solo in 1963.

Discography

Singles
 1958: "Chimes of Arcady" / "Ring-a My Phone" (Fontana H 148)
 1959: "Buzzin'" / "Cry, Cry, Baby" (Fontana H 176)
 1959: "Mister Dee Jay" / "Tell Him No" (Fontana H 190)
 1959: "(Seven Little Girls) Sitting in the Back Seat" (with Al Saxon) / "Sitting on the Sidewalk" (Fontana H 221)
 1960: "My Mother's Eyes" / "You Got What It Takes" (Fontana H 235)
 1960: "Tintarella Di Luna (Magic Colour Of The Moonlight)" / "Someone Loves You, Joe" (Fontana H 252)
 1960: "Two-Some" / "Down South" (Fontana H 283)

Compilations
 2011: Chantelly Lace: The Complete Singles Plus Bonus Tracks (RPM Records RETRO 896)
 2013: The Springfields, The Lana Sisters – Introducing The Springfields (One Day Music, DAYCD205)
 2014: Dusty Springfield featuring The Lana Sisters and The Springfields – The Early Years (Jasmine Records JASCD 759)

References

External links
 The Lana Sisters, Chantelle Music Ltd
 Archive feature from 2012: Lynne Essex – The Lana Sisters, The Widow Stanton

English girl groups
English vocal groups
Musical groups established in 1958
Musical groups disestablished in 1961